Della Hooke,  (born 1939) is a British historical geographer and academic, who specialises in landscape history and Anglo Saxon England.

On 5 May 1990, she was elected a Fellow of the Society of Antiquaries of London (FSA).

Selected publications
  Trees in Anglo-Saxon England: Literature, Lore and Landscape
  The Anglo-Saxon Landscape: The Kingdom of the Hwicce
  The Landscape of Anglo-Saxon England
  England's Landscape: The West Midlands
  Pre Conquest Charter Bounds Of Devon And Cornwall
  Anglo Saxon Wolverhampton: The Town And Its Monastery
  Worcestershire Anglo Saxon Charter Bounds
  Warwickshire Anglo Saxon Charter Bounds

References

External links 
 https://www.researchgate.net/profile/Della-Hooke
 https://archaeologydataservice.ac.uk/library/browse/personDetails.xhtml?personId=1146

1939 births
Living people
British women historians
Fellows of the Society of Antiquaries of London
Academics of the University of Birmingham